Joseph Keilberth (19 April 1908 – 20 July 1968) was a German conductor who specialised in opera.

Career
He started his career in the State Theatre of his native city, Karlsruhe.  In 1940 he became director of the German Philharmonic Orchestra of Prague. Near the end of World War II, he was appointed principal conductor of the venerable Saxon State Opera Orchestra in Dresden.  In 1949 he became chief conductor of the Bamberg Symphony, formed mainly of German musicians expelled from postwar Czechoslovakia under the Beneš decrees.

Ring Cycles at Bayreuth and in recording
Keilberth was a regular at the Bayreuth Festival in the early 1950s, with complete Wagner Ring Cycles from 1952, 1953 and 1955, as well as a well-regarded recording of Die Walküre from 1954 (the whereabouts of rest of the cycle are unclear) in which Martha Mödl, perhaps the greatest Wagnerian actress and tragedian of her time, sang her only recorded Sieglinde. He made the first stereo recording of the Ring Cycle in 1955, as well as a so-called "second cycle" with Mödl, rather than Astrid Varnay, as Brünnhilde. Mödl's accounts of Brünnhilde, from the 1953 Ring as well as the 1955 "second cycle," are her only recordings of the role other than Wilhelm Furtwängler's 1953 Rome Ring and commercial Walküre in 1954.

Other recordings
Among his other recordings, his outstanding interpretations of Wagner's Lohengrin at the 1953 Bayreuth Festival released on Decca-London and Weber's Der Freischütz made in 1958 for EMI, as well as a 'live' set of Richard Strauss's Arabella (featuring Lisa della Casa and Dietrich Fischer-Dieskau) made in 1963 for DG are still considered among the best versions. He conducted the TV-broadcast German-translation performance of Rossini's The Barber of Seville, featuring Fritz Wunderlich, Hermann Prey and Hans Hotter. His Haydn 85th Symphony and Brahms Fourth Symphony recordings on Telefunken are no less distinguished.

Death
He died in Munich in 1968 after collapsing while conducting Wagner's opera Tristan und Isolde in exactly the same place as Felix Mottl was similarly fatally stricken in 1911. His final recording, a Meistersinger, came a month before his death — at the Bavarian State Opera on 21 June.

Decorations and awards
 1945 Title of Professor by the Saxon government
 1949 National Prize of the German Democratic Republic, 1st class
 1956 Commander's Cross of the Order of the Phoenix (Greece)
 1961 Bavarian Order of Merit
 1964 Austrian Cross of Honour for Science and Art, 1st class
 1967 Culture Prize of Winterthur
 1967 Honorary Conductor of the NHK Symphony Orchestra, Tokyo (as second conductor in the history of the orchestra)

External links

1908 births
1968 deaths
Musicians from Karlsruhe
People from the Grand Duchy of Baden
German male conductors (music)
Music directors (opera)
Conductors (music) who died while conducting
Music directors of the Berlin State Opera
Recipients of the National Prize of East Germany
Commanders of the Order of the Phoenix (Greece)
Recipients of the Austrian Cross of Honour for Science and Art, 1st class
20th-century German conductors (music)
20th-century German male musicians